The 2005 Arkansas Razorbacks football team represented the University of Arkansas during the 2005 NCAA Division I-A football season. It was Arkansas' second straight losing season under Houston Nutt after six straight bowl appearances.

Running back Darren McFadden became the first freshman to rush for over 1,000 yards in a season (1,113) for Arkansas.

Preseason
Arkansas was ranked as the 45th best team in the country by NationalChamps.net and projected to finish 6-5.

Schedule

Game summaries

Missouri State

Vanderbilt

at No. 1 USC

at No. 20 Alabama

Louisiana–Monroe

No. 21 Auburn

at No. 4 Georgia

South Carolina

at Ole Miss

Mississippi State

at No. 3 LSU

Staff
Athletic Director: Frank Broyles
Head coach: Houston Nutt
Assistants: Reggie Herring (DC/LB), Mike Markuson (OL/Running Game), Roy Wittke (QB/Passing Game), Bobby Allen (CB), Clifton Ealy (TE), Danny Nutt (RB), Tracy Rocker (DL), James Shibest (WR/Specialists), Chris Vaughn (S/Recruiting)

Awards
All-American: KR/RB Felix Jones (CollegeFootballNews.com 1st team)
All-SEC: DT Keith Jackson (AP 2nd Team), KR/RB Felix Jones (Coaches' 2nd), RB Darren McFadden (AP/Coaches' 1st), LB Sam Olajubutu (AP 2nd), C Kyle Roper (AP 2nd)

References

Arkansas
Arkansas Razorbacks football seasons
Arkansas Razorbacks football